The Reeds Spring Formation is a geologic formation in southwestern Missouri. It preserves fossils dating back to the Osagean Series of the  Mississippian subperiod.

See also

 List of fossiliferous stratigraphic units in Missouri
 Paleontology in Missouri

References

Mississippian Missouri